Vyacheslav Sergeyevich Zinkov (born 26 May 1993) is a Russian professional football player who plays for FC Shinnik Yaroslavl in Russian First League.

Club career
He made his debut in the Russian Premier League on 26 May 2013 for FC Zenit Saint Petersburg in a game against FC Amkar Perm. He made his second appearance for Zenit on 23 September 2015 in a Russian Cup game against FC Volga Tver.

References

External links
 
 
 Profile by FNL

1993 births
People from Petrozavodsk
Sportspeople from the Republic of Karelia
Living people
Russian footballers
Association football midfielders
Association football defenders
FC Zenit Saint Petersburg players
FC Zenit-2 Saint Petersburg players
PFC Krylia Sovetov Samara players
FC Veles Moscow players
FC Shinnik Yaroslavl players
Russian Premier League players
Russian First League players
Russian Second League players